Levoberezhny District is an administrative district (raion), one of the sixteen in Northern Administrative Okrug of the federal city of Moscow, Russia. As of the 2010 Census, the total population of the district was 51,457.

Municipal status
As a municipal division, it is incorporated as Levoberezhny Municipal Okrug.

References

Notes

Sources

Districts of Moscow
Northern Administrative Okrug
